Events in 1982 in Japanese television.

Debuts
 Baxinger, anime (1982–1983)
 Uchuu Keiji Gavan, tokusatsu (1982–1983)
 Cobra, anime (1982–1983)
 Combat Mecha Xabungle, anime (1982-1983)
 Dai Sentai Goggle-V, tokusatsu (1982–1983)
 Gyakuten! Ippatsuman, anime (1982–1983)
 Hiatari Ryōkō!, drama (1982)
 Kikou Kantai Dairugger XV, anime (1982–1983)
 Lucy of the Southern Rainbow (1982)
 Shadow Warriors　III, drama (1982)
 Tōge no Gunzō, Taiga drama (1982)
 Tokimeki Tonight, anime (1982–1983)
 Super Dimension Fortress Macross, anime (1982–1983)

Ongoing
Music Fair, music (1964–present)
Mito Kōmon, jidaigeki (1969-2011)
Sazae-san, anime (1969–present)
Ōedo Sōsamō, anime (1970-1984)
Ōoka Echizen, jidaigeki (1970-1999)
Star Tanjō!, talent (1971-1983)
FNS Music Festival, music (1974-present)
Panel Quiz Attack 25, game show (1975–present)
Doraemon, anime (1979-2005)
Dr. Slump - Arale-chan, anime (1981-1986)
Urusei Yatsura, anime (1981-1986)

Endings
 Beast King GoLion, anime (1981–1982)
 Braiger, anime (1981–1982)
 Fisherman Sanpei, anime (1980–1982)
 G–Men '75, drama (1975–1982)
 Golden Warrior Gold Lightan, anime (1981–1982)
 Hello! Sandybell, anime (1981–1982)
 Hiatari Ryōkō!, drama (1982)
 Shadow Warriors　II, drama (1981–1982)
 Shadow Warriors　III, drama (1982)
 Superbook, anime (1981–1982)
 Taiyo Sentai Sun Vulcan, tokusatsu (1981–1982)
 Tōge no Gunsō, Taiga drama (1982)
 Yattodetaman, anime (1981–1982)

See also
1982 in anime
List of Japanese television dramas
1982 in Japan
List of Japanese films of 1982

References